Gibbula ardens is a species of small sea snail, known as top snails or top shells, marine gastropod molluscs in the family Trochidae, the top snails.

Description
The solid, umbilicate shell has a depressed conic shape with a variable sculpture. Its color is quite variable, but usually is reddish or olive brown, with a subsutural series of short white flammules, a row of white spots on the periphery, the remainder of the surface sparsely punctate with white. The spire is acute. The sutures are markedly canaliculate. The whorls (about 7) are convex and spirally lirate. Their interstices are obliquely regularly crispate-striate. The 5 or 6 lirae on the penultimate whorl are frequently grooved, and usually with lirulae between them. The base of the shell contains about 8 principal concentric lirae. The oblique aperture is smooth within, but apparently sulcate. The columella is subdentate in the middle. The umbilicus is funnel-shaped and is bordered by a white rib.

Distribution and habitat
This common species occurs in the Mediterranean Sea and the Adriatic Sea in the seagrass prairies of Posidonia oceanica; on the Atlantic coast of Portugal.

References

 Risso A., 1826-1827: Histoire naturelle des principales productions de l'Europe Méridionale et particulièrement de celles des environs de Nice et des Alpes Maritimes; Paris, Levrault Vol. 1: XII + 448 + 1 carta [1826]. Vol. 2: VII + 482 + 8 pl. (fiori) [novembre 1827]. Vol. 3: XVI + 480 + 14 pl. (pesci) [settembre 1827]. Vol. 4: IV + 439 + 12 pl. (molluschi) [novembre 1826]. Vol. 5: VIII + 400 + 10 pl. (altri invertebrati) [Novembre 1827]
 Payraudeau B. C., 1826: Catalogue descriptif et méthodique des Annelides et des Mollusques de l'île de Corse, Paris pp. 218 + 8 pl.
 Adams A., 1851: An arrangement of Stomatellidae, including the characters of a new genus, and of several new species, Proceedings of the Zoological Society of London 18: 29-40
 Brusina S., 1866: Contribuzione pella fauna dei molluschi dalmati, Verhandlungen der Kaiserlich-königlichen Zoologisch-botanisch Gesellschaft in Wien 16: 1-134
 Monterosato T. A. (di), 1880: Notizie intorno ad alcune conchiglie delle coste d'Africa; Bullettino della Società Malacologica Italiana, Pisa 5: 213-233. (1879)
 Monterosato T. A. (di), 1884: Nomenclatura generica e specifica di alcune conchiglie mediterranee ; Palermo, Virzi pp. 152
 Monterosato T. A. (di), 1888-1889: Molluschi del Porto di Palermo. Specie e varietà ; Bullettino della Società Malacologica Italiana, Pisa 13 (1888[1889?]): 161-180 14 (1889): 75-81
 Pallary P., 1904-1906: Addition à la faune malacologique du Golfe de Gabès; Journal de Conchyliologie 52: 212-248, pl. 7; 54: 77-124, pl. 4
 Pallary P., 1938: Les Mollusques marins de la Syrie ; Journal de Conchyliologie 82: 5-58, pl. 1-2
 Nordsieck F., 1972: Marine Gastropoden as der Shiqmona-Bucht in Israël; Archiv für Molluskenkunde 102(4-6): 227-245
Gofas, S.; Le Renard, J.; Bouchet, P. (2001). Mollusca, in: Costello, M.J. et al. (Ed.) (2001). European register of marine species: a check-list of the marine species in Europe and a bibliography of guides to their identification. Collection Patrimoines Naturels, 50: pp. 180–213

External links 

WoRMS
PESI
Discover Life

ardens
Gastropods described in 1793